Herman Jerome Russell (December 23, 1930 – November 15, 2014) was an entrepreneur and influential figure in Atlanta, Georgia.

Business career
Russell served as the first African American member of the Atlanta Chamber of Commerce. He founded H. J. Russell & Company, the largest minority-owned real estate and construction business in the United States. Russell was a 1991 recipient of the Horatio Alger Award, and received the title Georgia Trustee from the Georgia Historical Society in 2013. Russell's autobiography Building Atlanta was published in April 2014, shortly before his death.

Death
Herman J. Russell died on November 15, 2014, at the age of 83, in Atlanta Georgia and was buried at South-View Cemetery.

References 

African-American business executives
1930 births
2014 deaths
People from Atlanta
Philanthropists from Georgia (U.S. state)
Real estate and property developers
20th-century American philanthropists
Burials at South-View Cemetery
20th-century African-American people
21st-century African-American people